Stuart Slotnick (born June 8, 1969) is a New York City defense attorney and a partner at Buchanan Ingersoll & Rooney.

Personal life
In 2006, Slotnick married Amy Albert, a counsel to New York law firm Weiss & Hiller. His father is Barry Slotnick, a litigation attorney well known for defending Bernard Goetz.

Career
Slotnick graduated from Brandeis University cum laude and attended New York University for law school. He currently serves as the managing shareholder of Buchanan Ingersoll & Rooney's New York office. Prior to joining Buchanan Ingersoll & Rooney, he served as a special counsel at a New York litigation boutique.

Slotnick is known for defending several soldiers against the Army's stop-loss policy. In 2004, he successfully defended Jay Ferriola, a retired Army Captain who was ordered to redeploy to Iraq after completing eight years of service, under the grounds that the Army violated his due process rights. The case was the first to challenge the Army's stop-loss policy, which had affected tens of thousands of soldiers since the start of the Iraq War. Slotnick went on to successfully try four more similar cases.

Slotnick also serves as corporate counsel to billionaire casino magnate, Steve Wynn, in litigation matters that have resulted in successful dismissal of claims and positive settlements. He has also served as a long-time lawyer for American Apparel. In December 2006, he helped them navigate a $250 million acquisition deal with Endeavour Acquisition Corp. He later represented American Apparel when they were sued by Woody Allen for using Allen's image without permission. The suit was settled before trial by American Apparel paying Allen $5 million.

Slotnick represented Donald Schupak of Renaissance Art Investors in their case against Salander-O'Reilly art galleries. After the gallery's owner Lawrence Salander accumulated debts to multiple clients including Schupak, Salander was forced to postpone a huge exhibition. Slotnick went on to secure hundreds of works from Salander for Renaissance Art Galleries. He represented Weitz Communications in a suit against Capital Play over an allegedly unpaid consulting fee. He won a $2 million suit for a woman who had permanent liver damage from the diabetes drug Rezulin. Slotnick worked for Harvard Law Professor Alan Dershowitz and was acknowledged for his work in the New York Times bestselling book Chutzpah.

Most recently, Slotnick attained a settlement for Sportingbet PLC in a case against the United States Attorney of the Southern District of New York. Sportingbet PLC, a publicly traded company on the London Stock Exchange (LON: SBT) entered into a non-prosecution agreement and forfeiture of $33 million. The settlement was viewed as a positive one for Sportingbet, as a competitor, Partygaming PLC, settled similar charges in 2009 for $105 million.

References

1969 births
Living people
Brandeis University alumni
New York (state) lawyers
New York University School of Law alumni
Criminal defense lawyers